Lycidola palliata is a species of beetle in the family Cerambycidae. It was described by Johann Christoph Friedrich Klug in 1825. It is known from Brazil.

References

Hemilophini
Beetles described in 1825